is a Japanese footballer currently studying at the Niigata University of Health and Welfare.

Career statistics

Club
.

Notes

References

External links

2002 births
Living people
Japanese footballers
Niigata University of Health and Welfare alumni
Association football midfielders
J1 League players
J3 League players
FC Tokyo players
FC Tokyo U-23 players